Phoenix is the second EP by the American neo-psychedelic rock band The Warlocks, released in 2002 by the record label Birdman.

Track listing
"Baby Blue" – 3:52
"Oh Sandy" – 12:18
"Stone Hearts" – 7:08
"Minneapolis Mad Man" – 7:45
[Untitled track] – 34:37

References

External links 
 

2002 EPs
The Warlocks albums
Birdman Records albums